Narrow Neck may refer to:

Narrow Neck, New Zealand, a suburb of Auckland
Narrow Neck Plateau, in the Blue Mountains, near Katoomba, New South Wales, Australia
Narrowneck, Queensland, a section of coastline in Queensland, Australia